"Padam, padam..." is a song originally released in 1951 by Édith Piaf. It was written for her by Henri Contet (lyrics) and Norbert Glanzberg (music).

Composition 
It is a waltz. The song has been described as "maddeningly catchy".

The person singing the song experiences a music-related memory. She describes how a certain melody evokes in her memories of a former lover.

Track listings 
7-inch EP EMI Columbia ESRF 1023 (1954, France)
 "Padam padam..." (3:17)
 "Jézébel" (3:07)
 "Mariage" (4:16)
 "Les amants de Venise" (3:10)

Cover versions 
The song was covered, among others, by Tony Martin, Mireille Mathieu, Michael Heltau, Chimène Badi, and Ann Christy. It was also covered in 1988 by members of italian bands Litfiba, Violet Eves and Moda who sang all togheter. The song was published on a french only 7-inch single.

References 

 

1951 songs
French songs
Édith Piaf songs
Patricia Kaas songs
Mireille Mathieu songs